Escomb Church is the Church of England parish church of Escomb, County Durham, a village about  west of Bishop Auckland. It is one of the oldest Anglo-Saxon churches in England and one of only four complete Anglo-Saxon churches remaining in England, the others being St Lawrence's Church, Bradford-on-Avon, Greensted Church, and All Saints' Church, Brixworth. The church is a Grade I listed building.

Architecture

Anglo-Saxon
The church was founded about AD 670–675, when the area was part of the Anglian Kingdom of Northumbria. Much of the stone was taken from the nearby Roman fort at Vinovia (Binchester). On the gable of the south porch is a 7th or early 8th Century sundial, and on the north wall is a reused Roman stone with the markings "LEG VI" (Sixth Legion) set upside down. Above the sundial projects an Anglo-Saxon relief of an animal's head.

Because Bede (circa AD 673–735) did not mention the church, some have argued that it was not built until after his death. However, he only named churches which were associated with events he recorded.

The proportions of the nave are typically Anglo-Saxon: narrow and tall. The chancel is rectangular. The early character of the building and its similarity to other early work in Northumbria are consistent with it having been built between AD 650 and 800.

The chancel is  square.

Internally the most notable feature is the tall, narrow chancel arch. The southern impost of the arch is reminiscent of those in a gateway of the Roman fort at Chesters on Hadrian's Wall. This strengthens the theory that stones used at Escomb were brought from Binchester. Many of the stones show Roman tooling, which is common in Anglo-Saxon churches.

The chancel arch is of typical Roman form, tall with massive stone jambs, simple chamfered imposts and precisely-cut, radial voussoirs. It is unlike the non-radial voussoirs that the Anglo-Saxons typically made.

In the restoration of 1880 were found a number of delicately carved fragments of cross-shafts of the high quality commonly assigned to the Hexham school. They were found built into the gables, presumably during earlier restorations.

Gothic and later

At an unknown date the eaves were raised. The nave now has a crow-stepped gable at each end. Some simple Gothic windows were inserted in the 13th century and the south porch was built in the 14th century. In the 19th century more windows were inserted and a new door was installed in the porch.

But the majority of the windows, small and set high in the walls, are original Anglo-Saxon work. The church is essentially little changed from when it was built.

Neglect and restorations
Until the 19th century Escomb was a dependent chapelry of Bishop Auckland. In 1848 a vicarage was built at the top of the hill and Rev. Henry Atkinson became Escomb's first resident vicar for centuries.

The Anglo-Saxon church seated only 65 people, and in the 19th century Escomb's population outgrew it. In 1863 a new parish church, St John's, was completed next to the vicarage.

Thereafter the Anglo-Saxon church quickly fell into disrepair. By 1867 it had lost part of its roof. It was restored in 1875–80 by RJ Johnson at a cost of between £500 and £550. In October 1880 Joseph Lightfoot, Bishop of Durham, came and preached at a service to mark the completion of the restoration. But the building had no heating or artificial light, and thereafter was used for only a few services a year, from June until August.

By 1904 the roof was again in poor condition. In the 1920s the parish again raised money to restore the church, and on 1 June 1927 Handley Moule, Bishop of Durham presided at the Eucharist in the church to mark completion of the work.

The first surviving record of a proposal to install electric lighting in the church dates from 1940. In 1944 it was proposed again, along with gas heating. But the Diocesan Advisory Committee objected and the Diocese of Durham did not grant a faculty for the work. Heating and lighting were discussed again in 1950, but not installed.

In 1959 a new vicar, Rev. Henry Lee, was appointed to the parish. In 1960 the parish agreed to refurbish the building and Lee resumed summer services in it. The architect Sir Albert Richardson prepared plans and in 1962 both the parish and the diocese accepted them.

The plan was now for electric lighting and heating to be installed, along with a new altar and other furnishings. The cost of restoration and modernisation was estimated at £6,500. Historic Churches Preservation Trust donated £500 to the fund.

In 1963 St John's church, completed only a century earlier, was inspected and found to need repairs estimated to cost £6,500. But church attendance had declined, so the Diocesan Pastoral Committee decided that restoring both of Escomb's churches was not justified. It decided that the Anglo-Saxon church should once again be the parish church, and St John's should be deconsecrated and demolished.

Lee refused the proposal, but in 1964 he retired and the diocese suspended the living and the rural dean was made priest in charge. In 1967 restoration of the Anglo-Saxon church was begun, in December 1969 it reverted to being the parish church, and in 1971 St John's was demolished.

References

Bibliography

External links

670s establishments
7th-century church buildings in England
7th-century establishments in England
Church of England church buildings in County Durham
Grade I listed churches in County Durham
History of County Durham
Standing Anglo-Saxon churches
Tourist attractions in County Durham